Kwangali, or RuKwangali, is a Bantu language spoken by 85,000 people along the Kavango River in Namibia, where it is a national language, and in Angola.  It is one of several Bantu languages of the Kavango which have click consonants; these are the dental clicks c and gc, along with prenasalization and aspiration.

Maho (2009) includes Mbunza as a dialect, but excludes Sambyu, which he includes in Manyo.

Phonology

Consonants 

A dental click type  may also be heard, being adopted from the neighboring Khoisan languages. The clicks may also tend to be heard as alveolar .

Vowels 

Short vowels of /i e o u/ may also be pronounced as [ɪ ɛ ɔ ʊ].

References

 Dammann, Ernst (1957). Studien zum Kwangali: Grammatik, Texte, Glossar. Hamburg: Cram, de Gruyter
 Derek Nurse & Gérard Philippson, The Bantu languages, 2003:569.

Books 
 Rukwangali/English for Children, Éditions du Cygne, 2013, 
 Biblical passages in Kwangali

Kavango languages
Languages of Angola
Languages of Namibia